Carl von Hanno (24 November 1901 – 13 February 1953) was a Norwegian painter. His early style was influenced by cubism, and politically motivated. He later developed a personal, colourful style, often portraying seascapes.

Biography
He was born in  Kristiania (now Oslo), Norway.
He was a grandson of architect, sculptor and painter  Wilhelm von Hanno (1826-1882). His grandfather had operated a 
drawing school in Kristiania which was later operated his father Albert Oscar von Hanno  (1862-1938). He was a student at the 
Norwegian National Academy of Craft and Art Industry in 1920 and at the  Norwegian National Academy of Fine Arts 1920–22. He  spent a couple of semesters at the painting school of Pola Gauguin (1883–1961) from 1923. His first solo exhibition was at  Blomqvist Kunsthandel in 1924. Throughout his artistic career, von Hanno worked as an educator.  Carl von Hanno was  head teacher at the Oslo School of Architecture and Design 1937–51.

References

20th-century Norwegian painters
Norwegian male painters
1901 births
1953 deaths
Academic staff of the Oslo School of Architecture and Design
20th-century Norwegian male artists